{{DISPLAYTITLE:C4H7ClO}}
The molecular formula C4H7ClO may refer to:

 Butyryl chloride, an organic compound with the chemical formula CH3CH2CH2C(O)Cl
 Isobutyryl chloride, the simplest branched-chain acyl chloride

Acyl chlorides